Sajidan (also Romanized as Sajīdān) is a village in Siahkalrud Rural District, Chaboksar District, Rudsar County, Gilan Province, Iran. At the 2006 census, its population was 442, in 124 families.

References 

Populated places in Rudsar County